Nelson College for Girls is an all-girls state school in Nelson, New Zealand. Established in 1883, it has close ties with the all-boys Nelson College and has a private Preparatory School.

Nelson College for Girls was one of the highest rankings school in the Nelson region for NCEA with an average of 71% of Year 13 students achieved NCEA Level 3 in 2005. (This compares with a National average of 51.2% and Decile 7 Girls' schools - 68.9%)
The boarding house, Clarice Johnstone House is headed by Mrs. Barbara Symonds and caters for around 120 girls from years 7-13.

History 
Nelson College for Girls is a single-sex state school in Nelson, New Zealand. 

The school was established in 1883, and its first principal was Kate Edger, who was the first woman to earn a university degree in New Zealand. As was expected at this time, Kate resigned on her marriage in 1890, and was succeeded as Principal by Beatrice Gibson, one of the well-known Gibson sisters, who were very influential in girls’ education in the South Island at the turn of the 20th century. Gibson also resigned on her marriage, in 1900, and Althea Tendall took her place for a period of five years, followed by Margaret Lorimer from 1906 to 1926.  

Three of these early principals were graduates of Canterbury College, Christchurch, which came to an agreement with the school to enable pupils resident in Nelson, and enrolled at Nelson College for Girls, to receive university tuition from its staff. The pupils in Nelson were able to enrol in the same university classes as those available in Christchurch, sit the same examinations and receive the same qualifications. This arrangement continued until the 1920s.

Throughout its history, the school has enabled its students to attain high academic success as well as promoting a sense of the importance of being a part of the community.  During World War, many Old Girls of the school enlisted as nurses and served in theatres of war in a brave and admirable way.  Having a strong sense of giving back to community continues today with the significant group of students who volunteer in the local community.

The school has a boarding house which caters for a wide range of students from outside of Nelson.  The main house is named after another principal, Clarice Johnstone, who was instrumental in setting up the hostel. It caters for around 120 girls from years 7 – 13.

The arts
Music and arts are also very strong at the school, choirs, jazz band and orchestra and private tuition available for the musically inclined. The annual Arts Week organised by the Arts Committee is always a highlight in the year, presenting students from all over the school (even if not normally involved in the arts department) a chance to do fun artistic activities. The sports awards, house music event and weekly assemblies all provide chances for students to receive recognition from their peers for various achievements. Every week, they have a singing assembly. The arts committee chooses two or three for the girls to sing, they vary from cultural and traditional songs to jumpy, new hits. The whole school is very involved in the arts.

Houses
The school has five houses that divide the girls into groups for school competitions such as athletics, swimming, music, drama and academics. They are named after local landmarks, mountains, rivers and plains; Dun, Maitai, Maungatapu, Waimea and Whangamoa. Points are collected for each event and the end of the year overall winner is awarded with the Whangamoa Shield.

Notable alumnae

Muriel Bell (1898–1974), nutritionist and medical researcher
Jessica Bygate (born 1992), basketball player
Kate Isitt (1876–1948), writer and journalist
Courtney Love (born 1964), singer
Cora Wilding (1888–1982), YHA (NZ) founder
 Viran Molisa Trief, first female Solicitor-General and Supreme Court judge of Vanuatu
Bessie te Wenerau Grace, first Māori woman to achieve a university degree

Notable staff

Kate Edger, first woman university graduate in New Zealand
Ethel McMillan, politician
Richard Nunns, musician
Dorothy Kate Richmond, artist

Principals
Since its establishment in 1883, Nelson College for Girls has had 12 principals. The following is a complete list:

References

Further reading 
Stace, Hilary (1997) 'Oh for a girls' college'. Historic Places. No. 63, p. 20-21.

Educational institutions established in 1883
Girls' schools in New Zealand
Secondary schools in Nelson, New Zealand
1883 establishments in New Zealand
Alliance of Girls' Schools Australasia